The Quality Street Gang was a term used by the Scottish media to describe the Celtic reserve team of the late 1960s.  Several of the group eventually replaced members of the Lisbon Lions team that had won the European Cup in 1967. George Connelly, Kenny Dalglish, Davie Hay, Danny McGrain, Lou Macari and Paul Wilson all went on to win major honours at Celtic and were capped by Scotland.

In August 1968, Celtic Reserves needed to defeat Partick Thistle Reserves by at least seven goals to win their Reserve League Cup section over Rangers Reserves.  Celtic won 12–0, with Macari scoring four goals. Later that same year Scotland manager Bobby Brown asked Celtic manager Jock Stein to supply players to provide opposition for a warm-up practice match.  Stein sent his young reserve side, and they went on to defeat a full strength Scotland international team (including Colin Stein and Billy Bremner) 5–2.  In August 1970, Celtic fielded several of their so-called Quality Street Gang youths in the Glasgow Cup Final against a full strength Rangers side, winning 3–1.

List of The Quality Street gang

Davie Cattanach
George Connelly
Kenny Dalglish
Vic Davidson
John Gorman
Davie Hay
Lou Macari
Pat McCluskey
Danny McGrain
Brian McLaughlin
Pat McMahon
Billy Murdoch
Jimmy Quinn
Paul Wilson

Book and documentary
In 2013 a book The Quality Street Gang, by Paul John Dykes was published and plans announced for a documentary with filming due to commence in June 2014.

References

Celtic F.C.
Nicknamed groups of association football players